Enrico Elisi is an Italian pianist from Bologna, Italy.

Life and career 

In Italy Elisi has appeared in historical settings such as La Fenice Theatre, Venice; Palazzo Vecchio, Florence; Bibiena Theatre, Mantua; Pavarotti Opera House, Modena; Teatro Comunale and Sala Bossi, Bologna; Sant'Anna dei Lombardi Church, Naples, as well as the Cathedral in Amalfi. He has also given recitals in various European countries including France, Germany, Slovak Republic, Portugal and Spain. In Asia he performed in South Korea, China, Taiwan, and Singapore. Recent engagements include recitals at the Banff Centre for the Arts, Weill Hall at Carnegie Hall, the New York Public Library, New York’s Morgan Library, Washington’s National Gallery of Art and the Italian Embassy, and the Centro Cultural de España in Lima, Peru.

Elisi has appeared with the Florence Symphony, Italy; Orchestra Classica de Porto, Portugal; Bay Atlantic Symphony, Greeley Philharmonic, Williamsport Symphony, Pennsylvania Centre, Penn State Philharmonic, Penn’s Woods, UNLV Chamber and Johns Hopkins Symphony orchestras, USA. He also debuted as soloist/conductor with the Green Valley Festival Chamber Orchestra.

Among Elisi’s awards are top prizes in the Premio Venezia (Italy) and the Oporto International Competition (Portugal). After winning nine first prizes in competitions in Italy and the US, and having garnered a dozen of other top prizes and awards, Elisi performed in Toulouse, France, and New York’s Weill Recital Hall as a La Gesse Fellow.

Via Classica, a German radio station, offered a two-hour broadcast of Elisi’s live recital in Hamburg followed by an interview (2008). Additional radio broadcasts include Montebeni Classica FM (Italy), WCLV Cleveland, UNC, KCNV Nevada Public Radio, and KGCS (USA). He also appeared in a TV broadcast for WPSU and Portuguese national TV.

As a chamber musician, Elisi has performed at the Taos and Ravinia Festivals, and collaborated with players from the Baltimore, Chicago, and American Symphony Orchestras, as well as with other
soloists. As a champion of new music, Elisi has commissioned works from composers of many nationalities and premiered Paul Chihara’s Two Images, at Weill Hall—a composition he subsequently recorded (Albany Records).

Elisi appears and performs in such settings as Cincinnati Art of the Piano, Montecito, Lee University, Interlochen Center for the Arts, Texas State University, and Chautauqua Institution (USA); Associazione Umbria classica and Amalfi Coast Festival (Italy); Ameri-China Foundation and Sichuan International Piano Festival (China).

Elisi is a teacher, having presented hundreds of master classes, both in conjunction with his performing engagements, at Northwestern University, Boston University, Cincinnati College-Conservatory, Temple University, the University of Michigan, USA; University of British Columbia, Canada; National Conservatory of Lima, Peru; Accademia delle Marche, Italy; Taipei National University of the Arts, Taiwan; China Conservatory, Shanghai Conservatory, China; Academy of Performing Arts, Hong Kong; Yong Siew Toh Conservatory, Singapore; Jakarta Conservatory, Indonesia; Seoul National, Yonsei, Hanyang, Ewha Woman’s, as well as most other major universities in Korea. Elisi also held a two-year guest professorship at the China Zhejiang Art School in Hangzhou, China and has been teaching an annual workshop in Seoul.

Elisi recently joined the Faculty of Music of the University of Toronto as an associate professor, having previously served on the faculties of the Eastman School, the Pennsylvania State University, and the University of Nevada, Las Vegas since 2004. Elisi’s former students include prizewinner in competitions; hold teaching posts; performed with orchestras (including the Rochester Philharmonic and Dallas Chamber Symphony); gave debut recitals from New York to Caracas, Paris and Seoul; garnered fellowships and scholarships at summer programs and have been accepted in artist diploma, master, and doctoral programs in prestigious institutions in the US and abroad.

As an adjudicator, he has taken part in the Tremplin International and the Concours de Musique du Canada, the Nuova coppa pianisti (Osimo, Italy), the Iowa Competition, the Peabody Yale Gordon, the Julia Crane International, the Fite Young Artist competitions, several State Music Teachers Associations’ competitions (USA), as well as the Ameri-China Foundation Competition (Chengdu, China). In 2017 he will also adjudicate the Dallas International Piano Competition.

After studying at the Conservatory of Bologna and Florence and the Incontri col Maestro International Piano Academy of Imola, Dr. Elisi worked extensively (MM and DMA) with Schnabel’s disciple Leon Fleisher at the Peabody Institute of the Johns Hopkins University. A year after graduating, at Fleisher’s invitation, he performed at the World Piano Pedagogy Conference in a joint recital with his mentor. Among his teachers were pianists Lazar Berman and Boris Petrushansky, respectively pupils of Goldenweiser and Neuhaus, as well as Alexander Lonquich, Franco Scala and Giuseppe Fricelli.

Elisi's latest CD, Mozart Piano Works, has been released in 2011.

Notes and references

References
Enrico Elisi's website
Albany Records: Love Music, by Paul Chihara

External links
 Enrico Elisi's personal webpage
 Enrico Elisi's Calendar of Events
Enrico Elisi at the University of Toronto, Faculty of Music
Eastman Names New Faculty Members
 Enrico Elisi at Penn State University, School of Music
Enrico Elisi, Artist in Residence, University of Nevada, Las Vegas

Italian classical pianists
Male classical pianists
Italian male pianists
Living people
Musicians from Bologna
Eastman School of Music faculty
Conservatorio Giovanni Battista Martini alumni
Pennsylvania State University faculty
University of Nevada, Las Vegas faculty
21st-century classical pianists
21st-century Italian male musicians
Year of birth missing (living people)